D6, D.VI, D06 or D.6 may refer to:

Science and technology
 ATC code D06, Antibiotics and chemotherapeutics for dermatological use, a chemical classification
 Cervical intraepithelial neoplasia, ICD-10 code D06, an abnormal growth of cells on the cervix
 d6, a d electron count of a transition metal complex
 D6, in mathematics, the dihedral group of order 6
 D6-DMSO or deuterated DMSO, a molecule containing six deuterium atoms
 D6 HDTV VTR, a high-definition digital video tape recorder
 Nikon D6, a 20.8 megapixel DSLR camera

Transport and vehicles

Air
 Albatros D.VI, a 1917 German prototype single-seat twin-boom pusher biplane
 Auster D.6, a 1960 four-seat British light aircraft
 Bavarian D VI, an 1880 German saturated steam locomotive
 Dunne D.6, a British Dunne aircraft
 Fokker D.VI, a 1917 German fighter aircraft
 LFG Roland D.VI,  a 1918 German fighter aircraft
 Interair South Africa, IATA code D6, an airline based in Johannesburg, South Africa

Land
 Caterpillar D6, a 1956 medium bulldozer
 D-6 (Д-6), codename for the Moscow Metro 2
 D6 road (Croatia), a state road in Croatia
 London Buses route D6, a Transport for London contracted bus route
 PRR D6, an 1881 American steam locomotive model

Sea
 HMS Hampshire (D06), a 1961 British Royal Navy County-class destroyer
 HMS Keith (D06),  a British B-class destroyer built around 1930

Other uses
 d6, in gaming, a six-sided die
 D6 System, a proprietary role-playing game system
 Dublin 6, a postal district used by Ireland's postal service
 Hohner D6 Clavinet, an electrophonic keyboard instrument

See also 
 6D (disambiguation)
 DVI (disambiguation)